Rahmatabad-e Do (also Romanized as Raḩmatābād-e Do; also known as Raḩmatābād) is a village in Fathabad Rural District, in the Central District of Baft County, Kerman Province, Iran. At the 2006 census, its population was 14, in 4 families.

References 

Populated places in Baft County